Grindsted, with a population of 9,750 (1 January 2022),  is the municipal seat and largest town of Billund Municipality, Denmark and belongs to the Region of Southern Denmark. It is located 42 km west of the major regional city of Vejle and 49 km northeast of the major harbour city Esbjerg. The postal code is 7200.

History 
Grindsted is first mentioned in the 14th century, and for several centuries was just a village on the heath. Until the middle of the 19th century, Grindsted was a small, remote, distinctly moorland village. The construction of the main road Vejle — Grindsted — Varde in 1864 brought some progress, which was increased by the later significant cultural works in the area, but it was not until the many railway installations during the First World War that caused the strong development which made Grindsted an important railway hub.

Education
Grindsted has both private and public primary schools, upper secondary education and vocational education.

Industry 
In 1924 , the chemical factory Grindstedværket was built in the city, and the industrial community gradually grew up, so that both the cement and textile industries came to the city.
One of the main industries today is the DuPont factory, which traces its roots back to the original chemical factory named  (Grindsted Products) founded by the Lundsgaard brothers. Through acquisitions by De Danske Spritfabrikker, it became part of the Danisco corporation, but Danisco was acquired by DuPont in 2011; however, the factory only changed name on 14 May 2012. Products from Grindsted are still marketed under the Danisco logo and name.

Sport 
Grindsted Speedway Klub compete in the Danish Speedway League and the track is located at Blåbjergvej 1, 7200.

Notable people 

 Ole Kirk Christiansen (1891 in Filskov, near Grindsted – 1958): a Danish carpenter; in 1932 he founded The Lego Group
 Hein Heinsen (born 1935 in Grindsted): a Danish artist who has contributed to the Lutheran art of Scandinavia
 Carsten Thomassen (born 1948 in Grindsted): a Danish mathematician
 Boye Habekost (born 1968 in Grindsted): a football coach and a former player with over 200 club caps
 Allan Gaarde (born 1975 in Grindsted): a former professional footballer, 299 club caps and 39 goals for AaB
 Kian Hansen (born 1989): Danish footballer, over 250 club caps, plays for FC Nordsjælland
 Michael Jepsen Jensen (born 1992 in Grindsted): a speedway rider

References

Municipal seats of the Region of Southern Denmark
Municipal seats of Denmark
Cities and towns in the Region of Southern Denmark
Billund Municipality